Bawe Island is a small island in the Zanzibar Archipelago, in Tanzania. At the end of the 18th century, sultan Barghash ibn Sa'id of Zanzibar gave the island to the Eastern Telegraph Company, that used it as an operation station for the underwater telegraph cable connecting Zanzibar to Seychelles and Aden. This agreement was extended by sultan Khalifa ibn Sa'id in 1889, in favor of Cable & Wireless, that also built houses on the island to accommodate their personnel. Nowadays, Bawe is solely a tourist destination.

Footnotes

Islands of Zanzibar
Zanzibar Archipelago
Uninhabited islands of Tanzania